Krok Phra is a district (amphoe) in Nakhon Sawan province, central Thailand.

History
Originally, the district was named Noen Sala. However, as the old location was not convenient, the district office was moved to the west bank of the Chao Phraya River at Ban Krok Phra in 1899. The name of the district was then changed accordingly.

At first, the area was called Ban Krok which means 'village at a steep cliff'. According to the local lore, once an old rich couple from Ayutthaya wanted to move a big Buddha's image from Sukhothai to Ayutthaya on the Chao Phraya River. When it passed Ban Krok, the log broke and the Buddha image sunk into the river and could not be recovered. So the people in the district then called their village Ban Krok Phra, adding the word phra meaning 'venerable' to commemorate the event.

Geography
Neighboring districts are (from the north clockwise): Mueang Nakhon Sawan and Phayuha Khiri of Nakhon Sawan Province, and Mueang Uthai Thani, Thap Than, and Sawang Arom of Uthai Thani province.

Administration

Central administration 
Krok Phra is divided into nine sub-districts (tambons), which are further subdivided into 65 administrative villages (mubans).

Local administration 
There are three sub-district municipalities (thesaban tambons) in the district:
 Krok Phra consisting of parts of sub-district Krok Phra.
 Bang Pramung consisting of sub-district Bang Pramung.
 Bang Mafo consisting of sub-district Bang Mafo.

There are seven sub-district administrative organizations (SAO) in the district:
 Krok Phra consisting of parts of sub-district Krok Phra.
 Yang Tan consisting of sub-district Yang Tan.
 Na Klang consisting of sub-district Na Klang.
 Sala Daeng consisting of sub-district Sala Daeng.
 Noen Kwao consisting of sub-district Noen Kwao.
 Noen Sala consisting of sub-district Noen Sala.
 Hat Sung consisting of sub-district Hat Sung.

References

External links
amphoe.com (Thai)

Krok Phra